Emerson Tsai (born 2 August 1988) is a Taiwanese actor, television host and singer. He appeared on the third season of singing competition television series Super Idol in 2009, and came in eighth place. In 2010, Tsai made his acting debut in Monga, a gang film directed by Doze Niu. Since then, he has continued to act in both film and television with productions such as You Are the Apple of My Eye (2011), The Fierce Wife Final Episode (2012), Mr. Right Wanted (2014), Blue Sunny Days (2015) and Swimming Battle (2016).

Filmography

Film

Television series

Variety show

Event

Discography

Singles

References

External links
 
 

1988 births
Living people
Taiwanese male television actors
Taiwanese male film actors
21st-century Taiwanese male actors
21st-century Taiwanese male  singers
Taiwanese television presenters
Musicians from New Taipei
Male actors from New Taipei
Aletheia University alumni